Paolo Nuzzi (born 2 December 1939) is an Italian film director and screenwriter. He directed four films between 1964 and 1976. His 1974 film Il piatto piange was entered into the 25th Berlin International Film Festival.

Filmography
 Ecco il finimondo (1964)
 La donna scomparsa (1970)
 Il piatto piange (1974)
 Giovannino (1976)

References

External links

1939 births
Living people
Italian film directors
Italian screenwriters
Italian male screenwriters